Acanthocerus is a genus of leaf-footed bugs in the family Coreidae. There are at least three described species in Acanthocerus.

Species
These three species belong to the genus Acanthocerus:
 Acanthocerus crucifer Palisot de Beauvois, 1818
 Acanthocerus lobatus (Burmeister, 1835)
 Acanthocerus tuberculatus (Herrich-Schäffer, 1840)

References

Further reading

 

Articles created by Qbugbot
Acanthocerini
Coreidae genera